Valerie Anne Hoyle (born February 14, 1964) is an American politician serving as the U.S. representative for  since 2023. Until 2023, she served as the commissioner of Oregon's Bureau of Labor and Industries (BOLI) (commonly called the "Labor Commissioner").

A Democrat, Hoyle formerly served in the Oregon House of Representatives, representing District 14, which includes West Eugene, Junction City, and Cheshire. She was appointed to the House in August 2009 and reelected to full terms in 2010, 2012 and 2014.

In December 2021, Hoyle announced her candidacy for the U.S. House of Representatives in 2022. The seat was open after incumbent Peter DeFazio decided not to run for reelection.

Early life and education
Hoyle was born on Travis Air Force Base in Fairfield, California, in 1964. She earned a Bachelor of Arts degree in political science from Emmanuel College in Boston.

Early career 
In 1999, Hoyle and her family moved to Lane County, Oregon, where she joined the education advocacy group Stand for Children. Before serving in the Oregon legislature, she worked in sales and marketing for bicycle manufacturers Burley Design and Cane Creek, and served as legislative aide and policy analyst for State Senator Floyd Prozanski. She was also a director of the United Way of Lane County.

Oregon House of Representatives 
Hoyle was appointed to the Oregon House of Representatives in August 2009 to replace Chris Edwards, who was appointed to the Oregon State Senate. In 2010, she was reelected to a full term, defeating Republican Dwight Coon and Independent Kevin Prociw. On November 6, 2012, Hoyle again defeated Coon to win a second full term.

Before the 2011 legislative session, Hoyle was elected assistant caucus leader of the Oregon House Democrats. During the 2011 legislative session, she was co-vice chair of the House Subcommittee on Higher Education, and served on the House Committees on Health Care and Business & Labor. She also served on the Governor's Health Care Transformation Team.

On November 15, 2012, after House Democrats selected Tina Kotek as speaker of the Oregon House, Hoyle was elected to lead the Oregon House Democrats as House majority leader for the 2013 Legislative Session. During the 2013 legislative session, she co-chaired the House Task Force on O&C Counties and was vice chair of the House Committee on Rules.

Shortly before the 2014 legislative session, former State Representative Chris Garrett received an executive appointment to the Oregon Court of Appeals  and Hoyle was named chair of the House Committee on Rules. Hoyle also served as a legislative co-chair of the Oregon Elder Abuse Prevention Workgroup.

After Oregon Governor John Kitzhaber resigned in February 2015, elevating Kate Brown to the governorship, The Oregonian named Hoyle as a possible successor to Brown as Oregon Secretary of State. Hoyle stepped down as majority leader in 2015 to run for Oregon secretary of state. In the 2016 Democratic primary, she came in second place, receiving 33.81% of the vote to Democratic nominee Brad Avakian's 39.06%.

Oregon labor commissioner 

In 2018, Hoyle ran to become Oregon's 10th labor commissioner, a nonpartisan elected position. She won the race outright in May, receiving 52% of the vote and winning 17 of 36 counties. Former Tualatin mayor Lou Ogden received 36% and Jack Howard, a La Grande attorney and former Union County Commissioner, received 12%. The Commissioner of the Bureau of Labor and Industries serves a four-year term, has offices in Portland, Eugene, Bend and Medford, oversees enforcement of wage and hour laws, including prevailing wage and civil rights enforcement, certifies apprenticeship programs, and provides employment law technical assistance for employers.

U.S House of Representatives

Elections

2022 

On December 1, 2021, Hoyle announced her candidacy for Oregon's 4th congressional district in the United States House of Representatives in 2022. The seat was held by Peter DeFazio, who announced that he was not running for reelection. Polling conducted by Public Policy Polling in March 2022 found Hoyle to be favored in the Democratic primary. She benefited from more than $500,000 in spending by super PACs during the primary. In November 2022 Hoyle was elected to the House.

Tenure 
On January 31, 2023, Hoyle was among seven Democrats to vote for H.R.497:Freedom for Health Care Workers Act, a bill which would lift COVID-19 vaccine mandates for healthcare workers.

In 2023, Hoyle was among 56 Democrats to vote in favor of H.Con.Res. 21 which directed President Joe Biden to remove U.S. troops from Syria within 180 days.

Caucus memberships 

 New Democrat Coalition
 Congressional Progressive Caucus

Committee assignments 

 Committee on Transportation and Infrastructure
 Subcommittee on Highways and Transit
Committee on Natural Resources

Personal life
Hoyle lives outside Springfield, Oregon, and is married with two adult children.

Hoyle is Roman Catholic.

References

External links

 Congresswoman Val Hoyle official U.S. House website
 Val Hoyle for Congress campaign website

 

|-

|-

|-

|-

1964 births
21st-century American politicians
21st-century American women politicians
American Roman Catholics
Catholics from Oregon
Democratic Party members of the Oregon House of Representatives
Democratic Party members of the United States House of Representatives from Oregon
Emmanuel College (Massachusetts) alumni
Female members of the United States House of Representatives
Living people
Oregon Commissioners of Labor and Industries
People from Fairfield, California
Politicians from Eugene, Oregon
Women state legislators in Oregon